Durham Point is a small rock spur extending north from Mount Durham at the northwest end of the Tapley Mountains, in the Queen Maud Mountains of Antarctica. The feature was visited in December 1934 by the Byrd Antarctic Expedition geological party under Quin Blackburn, and named in association with Mount Durham.

References 

Headlands of the Ross Dependency
Gould Coast